On January 19, 1996, the mutilated remains of Diao Aiqing, who disappeared nine days prior, were found across multiple locations on or near Nanjing University in Jiangsu, China. Diao Aiqing had been dismembered into over 2,000 pieces. The case remains unsolved and is one of the most notorious crimes in the city. The case is officially known in China as the Nanjing 1-19 Incident or 1-19 Dismemberment Case.

Disappearance

Diao Aiqing was born in March 1976 in Shengao, Jiangyan District in the city of Taizhou, Jiangsu. She was the youngest of two siblings. According to her older sister, Diao Aihua, their family lived poorly, and she (Aihua) dropped out of school to find work. Meanwhile, Diao continued her studies and performed academically well. Diao successfully enrolled herself at Nanjing University. She arrived in Nanjing in October 1995 to attend the university's School of Adult Education. She majored in computer applications at the Department of Information Management. To avoid disrupting her studies, her family limited communications with Diao, even as far as not notifying her about the death of her grandfather and sister's marriage. Diao was described as "introverted and simple". She also did not enjoy interacting with people.

On January 10, 1996, in the evening, Diao and her dormitory roommate were punished for the illegal use of an electrical appliance. After a conflict with the dormitory management, she left the building and did not return. Diao was last seen alive wearing a red coat with a black lining. She was reported missing, but her family was not notified by the authorities until January 19.

Discovery
The discovery of Diao's remains in the winter of January 19 was first reported by a sanitary worker who found meat in a bag. Initially thought to be pork, the worker brought it home for food. While preparing the meat, three human fingers were found. The worker reported the discovery to the police who confirmed they were from a human. Human remains in plastic-wrapped packages were eventually discovered across eight locations around the university, including at a stadium, entrance gate, hospital, and along roadsides. The police later confirmed the scattered remains were of Diao's and informed her father to visit Nanjing. Between January 20 and 30, Diao's head and clothes were found.

Investigation
More than 2,000 human remains were recovered. Diao's head and internal organs were boiled for several days. Crucial organs including the heart, liver and spleen were never found. The forensics team was only able to identify the remains as belonging to a female through the analysis of body hair and muscle tissue. Relatives were able to identify her through a mole on her right cheek. A senior officer involved in the case described the killing as "really cruel". The officer added that pieces of flesh were dissected with high precision only achieved by an individual with great understanding of anatomy. Police concluded that the murderer must have been a professional butcher or surgeon.

Students and teachers became the subject of investigation. Two suspect profiles were brought up, including a single, physically fit, middle-aged male. However, the university department could not find any individuals that matched the characteristics of the profile. A major investigation was launched in the university and the areas around, but no major clues of the crime were found and the case failed to make any progress. In 2016, Nanjing police told the family of Diao that the case is still "under investigation".

Reaction
Nanjing University refunded Diao's tuition fees. Diao's family left Nanjing for their hometown five days later. The Yangtse Evening Post published a photograph of Diao in a "boyish haircut", and reported that she was last seen in a red coat. This information sparked fear within the community of a killer targeting short-haired women in red coats.

In 2021, Diao's family filed a lawsuit against Nanjing University for ¥1.62 million (US$246,000) for damages. Diao Aihua said that the lawsuit was to “seek justice” rather than compensation. The case rose to prominence recently with the use of DNA evidence to solve past high-profile murder cases. It has been compared to the Los Angeles Black Dahlia due to its similarities.

See also 
Murder of Abby Choi
Murder of Junko Furuta

References

1996 murders in China
January 1996 events in Asia
1996 in China
History of Nanjing